Moolala is a personal finance training company founded in 2009 by business journalist Bruce Sellery.  Throughout Sellery’s journalism career he interviewed thousands of people about money matters and learned one thing that almost everyone had in common; "smart people do dumb things with money."  In response, Sellery developed Moolala, financial workshops and learning centres that teach capable people how to approach money in a smart way and have fun doing it.

Moolala delivers programs for corporations to teach employees how to improve their financial well-being, and challenges people to connect with money and have fun in the process.

Books and Media 
In January 2011, the book; "Moolala: Why Smart People Do Dumb Things with Money (and what you can do about it) will be published by McClelland & Stewart.

Moolala has been featured in the Calgary Herald, Vancouver Province, Winnipeg Free Press, Windsor Star, Canadian Business magazine, Alberta Venture and others.

References

External links 
 Moolala

Financial services companies of Canada